Epaminondas José de Araújo (March 19, 1922 – June 9, 2010) was the Catholic bishop of the Diocese of Palmeira dos Índios, Brazil. Ordained a priest on August 12, 1945, de Araújo was appointed bishop on December 14, 1959 and was ordained on March 27, 1960. He served in three different dioceses in Brazil.

See also
Catholic Church in Brazil

Notes

20th-century Roman Catholic bishops in Brazil
1922 births
2010 deaths
Roman Catholic bishops of Anápolis
Roman Catholic bishops of Palmeira dos Índios
Roman Catholic bishops of Ruy Barbosa